The Meadow River is a tributary of the Gauley River, making its headwaters in Greenbrier County and terminating in Nicholas County of West Virginia.  It is named for the grassy meadows wetlands which its upper watershed drains, and from which it springs.

Course
Formed at the confluence of Eagle Branch and Callahan Branch, and flowing generally southeast to northwest, it passes Rupert, Charmco, and Rainelle. Major tributaries include Methodist Branch, Otter Creek, Little Clear Creek, Big Clear Creek, Mill Creek, Laurel Creek, Meadow Creek, Brackens Creek, Young's Creek, Glade Creek, Hendricks Creek and Dogwood Creek, before reaching its mouth at the Gauley River at Carnifex Ferry, West Virginia. The lower  is within the Gauley River National Recreation Area. The river drains .

Via the Gauley, New, Kanawha and Ohio Rivers, it becomes a part of the Mississippi River watershed.

History
In 1858 a dam was proposed near the present day site of the town of Rainelle, between Big Sewell and Laurel Mountains. It was never built.

Whitewater paddling below Rainelle
The  stretch between Rainelle, WV and Russelville features class III, IV, and a touch of class V in high water.  After a flatwater stretch the river reaches the town of Nallen.  Immediately below Nallen features mostly class III and IV water for the next  running up to the U.S. 19 bridge.  The final lower section below the U.S. 19 bridge to the confluence of the Gauley River is arguably the most difficult whitewater river in West Virginia.  This class V+ section has an extreme gradient and severely undercut rocks-claiming the lives of three experienced paddlers since records began to be kept.

Rapids include:
 Put In (Class III+)
 Rites of Passage (Class IV+)
 Hells Gates (Class 5.2)
 Brink of Disaster (Class 5.0)
 Coming Home Sweet Jesus (Class 5.3)
 Sieve City (Class 5.0)
 Heavy Water (Class IV)
 Lets Make a Deal (Class IV+)
 First and Second Island (Class V)
 Sliding Board (Class IV+)
 Double Undercut (Class 5.1)

See also
List of rivers of West Virginia

References

External links
 Real Time Flow Data from USGS

Rivers of Greenbrier County, West Virginia
Rivers of West Virginia
Rivers of Fayette County, West Virginia
Rivers of Nicholas County, West Virginia